Japanese China may refer to:

Taiwan under Japanese rule (1895–1945)
Manchukuo, a puppet state in Northeast China and Inner Mongolia (1932–45)
Reorganized National Government of the Republic of China, a collaborationist government in the Republic of China (1940–45)

See also
Sino-Japanese (disambiguation)
Japanese pottery and porcelain